The Cup of the Bulgarian Amateur Football League (Bulgarian: Купа на Аматьорската Футболна Лига) is a Bulgarian annual football competition established by the BFU in 1994.

Structure
All officially registered amateur football clubs in the country can participate. The tournament is held in three stages: regional qualifiers in September and October, play-offs involving regional leaders between November and March, and semi-finals and final in April and May. The matches from the final four stage of the competition are played on a neutral ground.

Winners

Multiple finalists

Winners by region

External links
 Zona90 - Bulgarian Portal For Amateur Football  
 AFL Cup Statistics - Bulgarian-football.com 
 Bulgarian Cup news from Topsport

References

Amateur Cup